Michele Serra (born 10 July 1954) is an Italian writer, journalist, and satirist.

Biography
Serra was born in Rome, but moved to Milan in 1959. In 1975 he started working for L'Unità, then the official newspaper of the Italian Communist Party (PCI). Serra is a long-time left-wing supporter, although he abandoned PCI's successor, the Partito Democratico della Sinistra, in 1991, because of dissent against the party's directions.

In 1986, he began to write satire for L'Unità satiric supplement Tango, winning the Satire Prize Forte dei Marmi the same year. In 1987 he also started collaborating for Mondadori's weekly Epoca, but abandoned it in 1990, when the publisher house was acquired by right-winged tycoon Silvio Berlusconi.

In 1989, Tango was replaced by Cuore as L'Unità'''s satirical supplement, and Serra was appointed by Massimo D'Alema as its director. Cuore was published weekly independently starting from 1991. In the same period Serra also began to write for Beppe Grillo's TV appearances and stage shows. In 1989, he published his first book, a short story collection entitled Il nuovo che avanza ("The advancing new").

On 7 June 1992, Serra began a popular satire column for L'Unità, entitled "Che tempo fa" accompanied by Ellekappa's comics. In 1994 he abandoned the direction of Cuore and, in 1996, began to collaborate for the newspaper La Repubblica and for the weekly L'Espresso, for which he continues to write as of 2008. Serra's first novel, Il ragazzo mucca, was published in September 1997.

In the following years, Serra wrote for numerous TV and theatre shows, including Fabio Fazio's Che tempo che fa. He is an atheist.

WorksGiorgio Gaber. La canzone a teatro (1982)Tutti al mare (1986)Visti da lontano (1987)Ridateci la Potemkin (1988)Il nuovo che avanza (1989)44 falsi (1991)Poetastro. Poesie per incartare l'insalata (1993)Il ragazzo mucca (1997)Maledetti giornalisti (with Goffredo Fofi and Gad Lerner, 1997)Che tempo fa (1999)Giù al Nord (with Antonio Albanese and Enzo Santin, 1999)
Canzoni politiche (2000)
Pinocchio Novecento (comments on Carlo Collodi text, 2001)
Cerimonie (2002)
De André il corsaro (with Fernanda Pivano and Cesare G. Romana, 2002)
I bambini sono di sinistra (with Claudio Bisio, Giorgio Terruzzi, Giorgio Gallione and Gigio Alberti, 2005)
Tutti i santi giorni (2006)
Psicoparty (with Antonio Albanese, 2007)
Breviario comico. A perpetua memoria (2008)
L'assassino (2013)
Gli sdraiati (2013)
Ognuno potrebbe (2015)

Gallery

References

1954 births
Living people
Italian atheists
Writers from Rome
Italian male journalists
Italian male writers
Italian television personalities
Italian magazine editors
La Repubblica people